The following is a list of notable shopping malls in Thailand, by province:

Bangkok

Chiang Mai Province
 Central Chiang Mai 
 Central Chiang Mai Airport

Chiang Rai Province
 Central Chiang Rai

Chonburi Province

Chonburi
 Central Chonburi

Pattaya
 Central Marina, Central Pattaya
 Central Pattaya, Central Pattaya
 Terminal 21, Central Pattaya
 Mike Shopping Mall, South Pattaya
 Royal Garden Plaza, South Pattaya

Khon Kaen Province
 Central Khon Kaen

Nakhon Ratchasima Province
 The Mall Nakhon Ratchasima
 Terminal 21 Korat

Pathum Thani
 Future Park Rangsit

Phitsanulok Province
 Central Phitsanulok

Prachuap Khiri Khan Province

Hua Hin

 Hua Hin Market Village

Songkhla Province

Hat Yai
 Diana Shopping Mall

Surat Thani Province

Surat Thani
 Central Suratthani

Udon Thani Province
 Central Udon

See also
 List of shopping malls in Bangkok

References

Shopping malls
Thailand